The Imphal East district of Manipur state in India is divided into 3 subdivisions. At the time of the 2011 Census of India, the Jiribam district (split in 2016) was a part of the Imphal East district.

Subdivisions 

The district has 3 subdivisions:

Towns 

The district has following towns:

Villages 

The district has following villages:

Sawombung subdivision

Porompat subdivision 

The following villages with 0 population were included in the 2011 census directory, but is no longer listed on the district website:

 Asei Loklen (census code 270277)
 Laingampat (census code 270291)

Keirao Bitra subdivision 

The following village with 0 population was included in the 2011 census directory, but is no longer listed on the district website: Leitambi (census code 270332).

References

External links 

 Revenue Villages (distinct from census villages) of Imphal East district

Imphal East